Ways to a Good Marriage (German: Wege zur guten Ehe) is a 1933 German drama film directed by Adolf Trotz and starring Olga Tschechowa, Alfred Abel and Hilde Hildebrand.  It was shot at the EFA Studios in Halensee in Berlin. The film's sets were designed by the art directors Heinz Fenchel and Botho Hoefer. The film was based on the ideas of the sexologist Theodore H. Van de Velde and was in the tradition of the enlightenment films of the Weimar Republic. Although his work had already been forbidden by the new Nazi regime, it was not formally banned until 1937 despite protests by Nazi students in Kiel who were successful in having the film pulled from cinemas there.

A separate French-language version L'amour qu'il faut aux femmes was released in 1934 and was also directed by Trotz although featured a different cast except for Olga Tschechowa.

Cast
 Olga Tschechowa as Claire Veiler, die unbefriedigte Frau
 Alfred Abel as Generaldirektor Veller, der Mann, der Kindersegen fürchtet
 Hilde Hildebrand as Eugenie von Bergen, die nymphomanische Frau
 Theodor Loos as Dr. von Bergen, der betrogene Mann
 Ali Ghito as Nadja, die eifersüchtige Frau
 Hertha Guthmar as Marceline, eine Studentin
 Lisa Mar as Eine Gymnastiklehrerin
 Lotte Lorring as 	Die hübsche Sekretärin
 Otto Wallburg as 	'Tange Paula', Eheberatung
 Walter Janssen as 	Dr. Bäumler, der Mann, der keine Zeit hat

References

Bibliography 
 Bock, Hans-Michael & Bergfelder, Tim. The Concise Cinegraph: Encyclopaedia of German Cinema. Berghahn Books, 2009.
 Hull, David Stewart. Film in the Third Reich: A Study of the German Cinema, 1933-1945. University of California Press, 1969.
 Klaus, Ulrich J. Deutsche Tonfilme: Jahrgang 1933. Klaus-Archiv, 1988.

External links 
 

1933 films
German drama films
1933 drama films
1930s German-language films
Films directed by Adolf Trotz
Films of Nazi Germany
German black-and-white films
1930s German films
Films shot at Halensee Studios